New Alexander is an unincorporated community in Columbiana County, in the U.S. state of Ohio.

History
New Alexander was laid out about 1812. A post office called New Alexander was established in 1829, and remained in operation until 1904.

References

Unincorporated communities in Columbiana County, Ohio
1812 establishments in Ohio
Populated places established in 1812
Unincorporated communities in Ohio